The Hangar, also known as Lancaster Municipal Stadium and formerly known as Clear Channel Stadium, is a baseball stadium in Lancaster, California, United States. From its opening in 1996 to 2020, the stadium was the home field of the Lancaster JetHawks, a now-defunct minor league team of the Advanced A California League. In 2005, Clear Channel Communications entered into a 10-year, $770,000 naming rights deal with the JetHawks and the City of Lancaster, who divided the revenue between them. The deal was planned to run through the 2014 season, but Clear Channel Stadium signage was removed in 2012. The stadium was then renamed The Hangar, its nickname since the stadium opened in 1996, as well as Lancaster Municipal Stadium. The Hangar is located near State Route 14 west of downtown Lancaster. The Hangar will serve as the home field of the Lancaster Sound Breakers, an independent baseball team of the Pecos League starting in 2023.

Features
Because of the area's aerospace legacy, the stadium has a NASA F/A-18 Hornet mounted on display at the front entrance. It is one of the premier facilities in minor league baseball. The $14.5 million facility offers luxury skyboxes, a video message board, and an old-fashioned manual scoreboard. The stadium's seating capacity is listed at 6,860, but can accommodate over 7,000 fans and features slightly over 4,500 permanent full chair stadium seats. Two expansive grass berm general admission areas are available when all seats are sold out.

The stadium is also used to accommodate special events such as local high school graduations, charity softball games, concerts, and the Field of Drafts (an annual brew festival by the City of Lancaster since 2013). Before the Lancaster JetHawks started each new season in April, they played an exhibition game against the local Antelope Valley College Marauders baseball team. However, for the last three JetHawks seasons, they played their exhibition games against the local University of Antelope Valley Pioneers baseball team.

Pilots Pavilion
On April 2, 2014, the Lancaster JetHawks introduced the largest addition to The Hangar since 2005: the Pilots Pavilion. The new tent structure on the third baseline just beyond the stands replaced the stadium's old barbecue tent. At 3,000 square feet and 25 feet tall, the Pilots Pavilion was nearly twice the size and nearly double the height of its predecessor. It was the largest structure of its kind in the California League before the 2019 season.

The roof canvas material weighed over 1,500 pounds and was supported by six trusses made up of over 6,000 pounds of steel. Just' In Construction, Inc. led the construction efforts.

References

External links
City of Lancaster
Lancaster JetHawks 
Ballpark Digest

Sports venues in Greater Los Angeles
Minor league baseball venues
Baseball venues in California
Buildings and structures in Lancaster, California
Sports venues in Los Angeles County, California
1996 establishments in California
Sports venues completed in 1996